Clément Couturier (born 13 September 1993) is a French footballer who plays for Luxembourgish club Swift Hesperange.

Club career
Couturier was a youth player  at Auxerre before moving to  Montceau and Belfort. He also played for Dijon and Chambly.

Belfort
On 29 May 2015, Belfort announced the signing of Couturier.

Chambly
On 16 June 2016, Couturier joined French club Chambly.

Les Herbiers
Couturier played for Les Herbiers as they reached the final of the 2018 Coupe de France, facing his former teammates from Chambly in the semi-final. On May 8, 2018, he played as PSG won 2-0 to clinch the 2017-18 Coupe de France with goals from Edinson Cavani and Giovani Lo Celso.

Dudelange
Couturier joined Dudelange in the summer of 2018 signing a two year contract with the option of a third year. He played in the 2018 UEFA Champions League qualifiers against MOL Vidi FC scoring a goal and he played in the Luxembourgers successful run to the UEFA Europa League group stages as they beat CFR Cluj and Legia Warsaw.

Argeș Pitești
On 2 December 2020, Romanian club Argeș Pitești announced that Couturier had signed for them for the rest of the season. However, the announcement was made prematurely, before the signing of any contract. When he arrived at the club, the contract offer was not the same, so he did not sign and returned to France.

Bastia-Borgo
On 21 January 2021, Couturier signed for Championnat National side FC Bastia-Borgo.

Swift Hesperange
On 19 July 2021, he returned to Luxembourg and signed with Swift Hesperange.

Personal life
His girlfriend is a midwifery student in Nancy.

References

1993 births
Living people
French footballers
Association football midfielders
Championnat National 2 players
Championnat National players
Luxembourg National Division players
Challenger Pro League players
Liga I players
Dijon FCO players
FC Montceau Bourgogne players
ASM Belfort players
FC Chambly Oise players
Les Herbiers VF players
F91 Dudelange players
R.E. Virton players
FC Bastia-Borgo players
FC Swift Hesperange players
French expatriate footballers
Expatriate footballers in Luxembourg
French expatriate sportspeople in Luxembourg
Expatriate footballers in Belgium
French expatriate sportspeople in Belgium
People from Chaumont, Haute-Marne
Sportspeople from Haute-Marne
Footballers from Grand Est